Red paper wasp can refer to:

Polistes carolina, found in the eastern United States
Polistes rubiginosus, found in the eastern United States
Polistes canadensis, found across the Neotropical realm, from Arizona through Central America and into South America
Polistes major castaneicolor, found in the desert southwestern United States and into Sonora, Mexico